There is a huge variation in the climatic conditions of Himachal Pradesh due to variation in altitude (360–6500 metres). The climate varies from hot and sub-humid tropical (450–900 metres) in the southern low tracts, warm and temperate (900–1800 metres), cool and temperate (1800–2400 metres) and cold glacial and alpine (2400–4800 metres) in the northern and eastern high elevated mountain .Pollution is affecting the climate of almost all the states of India.
By October, nights and mornings are very cold. Snowfall at elevations of nearly 3000 m is about 3km and lasts from December start to March end. About 4500 m, is perpetual snow.

The spring season starts from mid February to mid April. The weather is pleasant and comfortable in the season.
The rainy season start at the end of the month of June. The landscape lushes green and fresh. During the season streams and natural springs are replenished. The heavy rains in July and August cause erosion, floods and landslides. Of all the state districts, Dharamshala receives the highest rainfall, nearly about 3400 mm. Spiti is the driest area of the state (rainfall below 50mm). The reason is that it is enclosed by high mountains on all sides.

Rainfall

The average annual rainfall is 1,251(mm). The rainy season start at the end of the month of June. The landscape lushes green and fresh. During the seasonal streams and natural springs are replenished. The heavy rains in July and August cause erosion, floods, and landslides. Of all the state districts, Dharamshala receives the highest rainfall, nearly about 3400 mm. Spiti is the driest area of the state (rainfall below 50mm).

Climate data

References

Geography of Himachal Pradesh
Climate of India